Minnesota State Forests are State forests located within the U.S. State of Minnesota. The 59 state forests were established by the Minnesota Legislature in order to conserve and manage the forest resources, including: Timber management, Wildlife management, Water resources management, and Public recreation.

Minnesota's state forests are generally managed by the Minnesota Department of Natural Resources, Division of Forestry - headquartered in Saint Paul, Minnesota. Some forest land is managed entirely or in-part by the counties in which they are located in, or by the United States Forest Service in cases where state forests are located within the boundaries of either Chippewa National Forest or Superior National Forest. 

The following is a list of state forests in Minnesota:

List of Minnesota state forests

See also
 List of Minnesota state parks
 Natural history of Minnesota
 List of Minnesota trees

 List of U.S. National Forests
 Chippewa National Forest
 Superior National Forest
 United States Forest Service

References

External links

 Minnesota State Forests, Minnesota Department of Natural Resources (official website)
 Interactive map of the Minnesota State Forests
 Division of Forestry, Minnesota Department of Natural Resources

 
Minnesota
State forests